Donald Trump's use of social media attracted attention worldwide since he joined Twitter in May 2009. Over nearly twelve years, Trump tweeted around 57,000 times, including about 8,000 times during the 2016 election campaign and over 25,000 times during his presidency. The White House said the tweets should be considered official statements. When Twitter banned Trump from the platform in January 2021 during the final days of his term, his handle @realDonaldTrump had over 88.9 million followers. On November 19, 2022, Twitter's new owner, Elon Musk, reinstated his account, although Trump has stated he will not use it in favor of his own social media, Truth Social.

For most of Trump's presidency, his account on Twitter, where he often posted controversial and false statements, remained unmoderated in the name of "public interest". Congress performed its own form of moderation: on July 16, 2019, the House of Representatives voted mostly along party lines to censure him for "racist comments" he had tweeted two days previously. In the face of this political censure, his tweets only accelerated. An investigation by The New York Times published November 2, 2019, found that, during his time in office to date, Trump had already retweeted at least 145 accounts that "have pushed conspiracy or fringe content, including more than two dozen that have since been suspended." In 2020, Trump also spread misinformation about the COVID-19 pandemic.

During his 2020 reelection campaign, he falsely suggested that postal voting or electoral fraud may compromise the election, prompting Twitter to either remove such tweets or label them as disputed. After his election loss, Trump persistently undermined the election results in the weeks leading to Joe Biden's inauguration. His tweets played a role in inciting the January 6, 2021, attack of the US Capitol during the formal counting of electoral votes. Though the Senate eventually acquitted Trump during his second impeachment, social media companies swiftly banned him. Facebook and Instagram banned him for two years. Twitter permanently suspended his @realDonaldTrump handle, followed by the official account of his campaign (@TeamTrump) and the accounts of allies who posted on his behalf, like Trump campaign digital director Gary Coby. Twitter also deleted three tweets by Trump on the @POTUS handle and barred access to the presidential account until Joe Biden's inauguration. During the first week that Trump was banned on several platforms (January 9–15), election-related misinformation declined 73 percent, according to research analytics firm Zignal Labs.

As Trump continued to issue brief statements, his spokesperson Liz Harrington tweeted screenshots of them under the Save America logo from June 2021 to June 2022. Since then, however, her Twitter handle @realLizUSA has been infrequently used. She said she would move to Truth Social, a Trump-affiliated social media application that launched on February 21, 2022.

Background

The emergence of social media has changed the way in which political communication takes place in the United States. Political institutions such as politicians, political parties, foundations, institutions, and political think tanks are all using social media platforms, like Facebook and Twitter, to communicate with and engage voters. Regular individuals, politicians, "pundits" and thought leaders alike are able to voice their opinions, engage with a wide network, and connect with other likeminded individuals. According to Wael Ghonim, social media can reinforce pre-existing beliefs rather than promote new ones. Social media, while a great source of gathering volunteers and money, serves the main purpose of affirming political beliefs and strengthening a political base. Politicians have a platform to communicate with that is different from the mainstream media. Politicians have the ability to raise large amounts of money in relatively short periods of time through social media campaigns. In 2012, President Barack Obama raised over a billion dollars for his campaign, which broke the fundraising record. Around $690 million was raised through online donations including social media, email, and website donations, and more money was raised from small donors than ever before.

The 2008 US presidential election was the first election in which candidates utilized the Internet and social media networking as a communicative tool incorporated into candidates' campaigns. In 2008, President-elect Barack Obama was the first to use the Internet to organize supporters, advertise, and communicate with individuals in a way that had been impossible in previous elections. Obama utilized sites like YouTube to advertise through videos. The videos posted on YouTube by Obama's were viewed for 14.5 million hours.
, more candidates were utilizing a wider array of social media platforms. Politicians were now on social networking sites like Twitter, Instagram, YouTube and other new social media tools and mobile apps. Some of the candidates used social media sites to announce their candidacy. Barack Obama emailed a video to 13 million when he announced his intention to run for re-election, and Mitt Romney sent out a tweet.
By May 16, 2011, @BarackObama was followed by 7.4 million people, including twenty-eight world leaders. His account became the third account to reach 10 million followers in September 2011.

Twitter

From his official declaration of candidacy in 2015, Donald Trump benefited from large numbers of supporters active on social media. Some supporters called themselves "Centipedes" online.

As president, Trump preferred to communicate over social media, announcing policy changes and the dismissals of staff members there. Trump largely bypassed the White House Press Secretary, and his administration ended the daily White House press briefing. Trump preferred "to dictate and dominate the news cycle"; his communications emphasized his political grievances, promoted conspiracy theories, and attacked those he regarded as enemies.

Trump used the retweet feature on Twitter to forward messages he agreed with (often posts praising him), no matter how obscure their authors were. At times, Trump retweeted himself, and sometimes commented "so true" while doing so.

Followers
The @realdonaldtrump handle had amassed 88.7 million followers by the time Twitter suspended it in January 2021 after the 2021 United States Capitol attack.

When Trump announced his presidential campaign in 2015, he had 2.98 million followers; his follower count thereafter increased rapidly. Many of his followers, however, were fake accounts and Twitter bots: a May 2017 analysis concluded that, of the then-30.9 million followers of Trump's personal Twitter account, 51 percent were real and 49 percent were fake. In mid-2018, Twitter conducted a site-wide crackdown on fake accounts, reducing the total number of users of the site by about 6 percent; as a result, Trump lost about 100,000 of his then-53.4 million followers. Trump repeatedly complained about reductions in the number of followers, claiming that Twitter was biased against him, and raised his complaints in tweets and in a private meeting with Twitter CEO Jack Dorsey. In October 2018, the research group SparkToro estimated that more than 6 percent of Trump's followers were "bots, spam, inactive or propaganda"—a significantly higher percentage than for followers of other American politician Twitter accounts.

Public opinion 
Trump's advisors warned him that his tweets may alienate some of his supporters. In a June 2017 Fox News poll, 70 percent of respondents said Trump's tweets hurt his agenda. In a January 2019 UMass Lowell poll, 68 percent of all respondents aged 18–37 said Trump tweeted too much.

Rate of tweets 
In November 2016, shortly after winning the election, Trump said in a 60 Minutes interview that, as president, his use of social media would be "very restrained, if I use it at all." Trump went on to Tweet more than 25,000 times during his presidency; by the first half of 2019, he was tweeting as frequently as he had as a candidate, and he doubled this rate during the second half of 2019 and the first half of 2020. On his most prolific day, June 5, 2020, he tweeted 200 times.

Tweets counted through Trump Twitter Archive.

In addition to the tweets he put out, he was also the intended recipient of tweets by others. In 2019, Donald Trump was tagged on Twitter at a rate of 1,000 times per minute, according to The New York Times.

Device security 
After the inauguration, the White House would not comment on whether Trump was using a secure phone.

Before, he had been using a Samsung Galaxy S3 which only has Android 4.3.1 as its latest OS, a version of Android which Google marked as unsupported and discontinued as of Trump's inauguration. Since then, he has used an iPhone to use Twitter.

The iPhone Twitter app used by Trump in 2018 lacked certain security features, and Politico reported in May 2018 that Trump's phone "has gone as long as five months" without being checked by security experts.

On October 24, 2018, The New York Times reported that Trump was still using his personal iPhones for phone calls, even though his aides and US intelligence officials have warned him that Russian and Chinese spies are listening. Trump responded by tweeting: "I only use Government Phones." The tweet was sent from an iPhone. (In the same tweet, he claimed that he has only one such government phone and that it is "seldom used.")

Trump's @realDonaldTrump Twitter account was breached twice by Dutch hacker Victor Gevers, both times by guessing weak passwords. The first incident took place in 2016, using the guessed password "yourefired". The password was guessed because it had previously been discovered in a 2012 LinkedIn password breach. The second incident took place in October 2020, when his account was breached by guessing the password "maga2020!". Although reports of the second attack were denied by Twitter and the White House, they were later confirmed by Dutch prosecutors in December 2020.

Tweets as official statements
Throughout his presidency, Trump frequently appeared to issue orders through his tweets. Whether these tweets were official directives was unclear. A US National Archives spokesman said that Trump's tweets are considered presidential records.

In 2017, the Department of Justice argued in one court case that Trump's tweets were "official statements of the President of the United States." In another case, the DOJ argued they were official policy statements but that the tweets were also "personal conduct that is not an exercise of state power." The ABA Journal wrote in 2017, "There's little caselaw on to what extent government use of social media can be considered official or a 'public forum,' which affords First Amendment protection to people who might be excluded based on their viewpoints."

In 2019, the Secretary of the US Navy said he did not interpret a Trump tweet as a "formal order to act" after Trump tweeted that the Navy should not take away Chief Petty Officer Edward Gallagher's status as a Navy SEAL.

In 2020, a court asked that Trump clarify his intention after he tweeted what appeared to be an order calling for the disclosure of documents related to Russian interference in the 2016 election. In a court filing White House Chief of Staff Mark Meadows said that: "The President indicated to me that his statements on Twitter were not self-executing declassification orders and do not require the declassification or release of any particular documents."

Timeline
In 2009, marketing staffer Peter Costanzo suggested to Trump that he could use social media to draw attention to his book, Think Like a Champion, which was due to be released later that year. He was unable to use the username @DonaldTrump, as it was already being used by a parody account. He and his marketing team decided to use the username @realDonaldTrump. Trump joined Twitter in March 2009 and sent out his first tweet on May 4, 2009, advertising his upcoming appearance on the Late Show with David Letterman, which was due to air a couple of days later.

From 2009 to 2011, tweets posted by the @realDonaldTrump account included the phrase "from Donald Trump" to distinguish them from those written by his staff, but by about June 2011, as Trump's use of the platform increased, those identifying labels disappeared. During the 2016 campaign, some tweets were sent from an Android phone, and others from an iPhone. The Android tweets were more likely to be sent outside of business hours and to take a more combative tone. The iPhone tweets were suspected to be written and sent by members of Trump's staff, a suspicion that was largely confirmed using sentiment analysis; machine learning and natural language processing could still frequently distinguish Trump's tweets from others sent in his name, even when staffers attempted to emulate his writing style.

In 2012, following the victory of Obama in the presidential election, Trump tweeted a chain of disparaging comments about Obama's win. He mocked Obama for playing basketball and blamed the Chinese for creating "the concept of global warming". Trump tweeted the next day, "but we'll have to live with it!" and: "We have to make America great again!" In response, Obama sarcastically quipped on The Tonight Show With Jay Leno: "This all dates back to when [he and Trump] were growing up together in Kenya," referring to the birther conspiracy.

Trump's Twitter activity significantly increased beginning in 2013; he tweeted more frequently and with more politically charged rhetoric.

Twitter was an important tool in Trump's 2016 presidential election campaign, and has been credited as contributing to his victory. Former White House communications director Anthony Scaramucci recalled that Trump: "felt that there was no separation between his brand and the media, that there was an intersection of value for himself personally between his brand and saturating it in the media". Daniel Pfeiffer, Obama's former strategy communications advisor, commented that Trump is: "way better at the internet than anyone else in the GOP which is partly why he is winning". According to The New York Times, other presidential aides have described Trump "as a sophisticated version of a parrot, given his penchant for repeating information almost unfiltered, as soon as he had processed it."

In 2017, Trump was described as "possibly the first 'social media' and 'reality TV' president" in an article by Van Jones on CNN's website in October 2017. Following Trump's inauguration, he gained control of the official US presidential Twitter account (@POTUS), which had been created by Obama. Trump's first tweets as president were made from his personal account, but he has used both accounts. After Joe Biden won the November 2020 presidential election, Twitter said it planned to hand over the @POTUS account to Biden upon his inauguration on January 20, 2021, which has since happened.

Live-tweeting Fox & Friends
Trump frequently watched the Fox News show Fox & Friends and often tweeted reactions to what he has seen on the show. For example, on January 2, 2018, Trump tweeted that his "Nuclear Button" was "much bigger & more powerful" than Kim Jong-un's, following a Fox News segment about Kim's "nuclear button" minutes before. Trump watches several hours of cable news shows each day, using the "Super TiVo" he had installed at the White House. News organizations have compiled lists of Trump tweets directly repeating what he was watching. The result is that stories that Fox concentrates on become nationally important stories by virtue of the fact that they appear in presidential tweets, setting up a feedback loop. During his first year in office, he mentioned the Fox & Friends Twitter account more than any other account.

Insults
In January 2016, a review by The New York Times found that one in every eight posts by Trump on Twitter "was a personal insult of some kind". From the beginning of his term until May 2019, Trump had insulted 598 people (including private citizens), places, and things on Twitter; targets of insults included politicians, journalists, news outlets, television hosts and programs, former staffers and associates, government agencies, business leaders, books critical of him, the State of California and State of New York, and entire countries. The New York Times published an inventory of all of Trump's Twitter insults from 2015 until January 2021.

Trump often gave opponents nicknames such as "Crooked Hillary" and "Lyin' Ted". In 2015, he tweeted against an 18-year-old college student who had challenged him at a New Hampshire political forum, which led to a wave of online harassment against her. In December 2016, as president-elect, he responded to criticism from the president of United Steelworkers Local 1999 in Indiana by tweeting that the local union leader "has done a terrible job representing workers"; the union president received threatening phone calls afterward.

International threats

2017–2019 Qatar diplomatic crisis

In 2017, the Qatar diplomatic crisis erupted. An escalation of the Qatar–Saudi Arabia diplomatic conflict, it began when Saudi Arabia, United Arab Emirates, Bahrain, and Egypt abruptly cut off diplomatic relations with Qatar, alleging that the Qatari government supported terrorists. The severing of relations included withdrawing ambassadors, and imposing trade and travel bans. In a series of tweets, Trump praised the Gulf nations' move against Qatar, took credit for engineering the crisis, and repeatedly criticized Qatar, undermining simultaneous efforts by Trump's Secretary of State Rex Tillerson, US Ambassador to Qatar Dana Shell Smith, and Secretary of Defense James Mattis, all of whom took a neutral stance, called for dialogue and compromise in the interests of regional security, and noted that Qatar hosted the Al Udeid Air Base.

Threat to destroy North Korea 

In September 2017, Trump posted tweets about North Korea that some saw as violating Twitter's rule against making threats of violence. On September 19, he stated that under certain circumstances, "we will have no choice but to totally destroy #NoKo", and on September 23, "Just heard Foreign Minister of North Korea speak at U.N. If he echoes thoughts of Little Rocket Man, they won't be around much longer!" ("Little Rocket Man" was Trump's nickname for North Korean leader Kim Jong-un). In response to user concerns, Twitter cited newsworthiness and whether the tweet is of public interest as factors they consider in whether a tweet violates their rules. The company acknowledged that these guidelines are internal, and stated they would update their public-facing rules to reflect them.

Threat to destroy Iran's cultural sites 

On January 4, 2020, Trump threatened in a tweet that "if Iran strikes any Americans, or American assets," it could expect that "52 Iranian sites (representing the 52 American hostages taken by Iran many years ago)...important to Iran & the Iranian culture" would be "HIT VERY FAST AND VERY HARD." Deliberately targeting cultural sites would have been a war crime. The next day, he tweeted: "Should Iran strike any U.S. person or target, the United States will quickly & fully strike back, & perhaps in a disproportionate manner."

Sharing of violent, far-right, and extremist content
Trump has been criticized for his practice of retweeting or copying material from social media accounts posting antisemitic, racist, or false information, such as claims exaggerating the number of crimes committed by black people.

During campaign
PolitiFact singled out as particularly obviously false an image retweeted by Trump that claimed that 81 percent of white murder victims are killed by black people. Politifact noted that, besides being a five-fold exaggeration, the claim was sourced to the non-existent "Crime Statistics Bureau, San Francisco"; it later highlighted this retweet when awarding its 2015 "Lie of the Year" badge to Trump's entire presidential campaign. The fake statistics were first posted by a neo-Nazi Twitter account.

An image posted by Trump on July 2, 2016, called Hillary Clinton the "Most Corrupt Candidate Ever!" and featured a six-pointed star reminiscent of the Jewish Star of David; the image first appeared in a June 15 tweet by @FishBoneHead1, a Twitter account described by the Associated Press as being known for "anti-Clinton and right-leaning messages and images" and by Mic as promoting "violent, racist memes," before making its way to 8chan's /pol/ on June 22. Trump's social media manager Dan Scavino responded that the image had been sourced by him from a Twitter page "where countless images appear" and that he had assumed that the star referred to a sheriff's badge. Under two hours later, the tweet was deleted from Trump's account in favor of a nearly identical tweet with a circle in place of the star, but Trump later blamed the deletion on his staff, stating: "I would've rather defended it." Jeremy Diamond of CNN observed: "It wasn't the six-pointed star alone that evoked anti-Semitism – it's the combination of the star with a background of money and an accusation of corruption, which suggests stereotypical views of Jews and money and raises conspiracy theories that Jews control political systems." The episode led Dana Schwartz, a Jewish employee of Trump's son-in-law Jared Kushner, to write an open letter to him in protest, to which he responded.

CNN wrestling video

On July 2, 2017, Trump tweeted a video of himself attacking Vince McMahon during WrestleMania 23 with the CNN logo over McMahon's face. In response, Brian Stelter of CNN issued a statement saying that Trump was "encouraging violence against reporters" and "involved in juvenile behavior far below the dignity of his office". CNN also responded to the tweet by quoting Sarah Huckabee Sanders who claimed the previous week "The president in no way form or fashion has ever promoted or encouraged violence." Homeland Security Advisor Tom Bossert said that "no one would perceive [the tweet] as a threat." Trump subsequently said that CNN took the post too seriously, adding that CNN has "hurt themselves very badly".

The clip appeared on pro-Trump subreddit, r/The Donald, about four days earlier, and was created by a Reddit account which had previously posted racist, antisemitic and bigoted content. A White House official later denied that the video came from Reddit; the official declined "to respond to questions about where the president obtained the clip." , the tweet had been retweeted over 330,000 times, making it Trump's most retweeted post.

Britain First videos

On November 29, 2017, Trump retweeted three inflammatory and unverified anti-Muslim videos from Britain First, a British far-right and ultranationalist group that has a history of posting misleading videos. One of the videos purported to show an assault by a Muslim immigrant, but the assailant was neither a Muslim nor an immigrant. Another video was filmed in 2013 during the Syrian Civil War, showing a man, who is believed to be an Al-Nusra supporter, destroying a statue of Mary and stating: "No-one but Allah will be worshipped in the land of the Levant." A third video contains footage filmed during a period of violent unrest following the 2013 Egyptian coup d'état. The videos had been shared by Britain First deputy leader Jayda Fransen, who was convicted of religiously aggravated harassment in Britain in 2016. Trump's promoting inflammatory content from an extremist group was without precedent among modern American presidents.

Trump's actions were widely condemned both in the US and abroad by politicians, commentators and religious leaders of various faiths and across the political spectrum; also by several civil rights and advocacy groups and organizations. The incident resulted in calls for Trump to be banned from the UK, but his invitation to visit to the United Kingdom was not withdrawn. When asked by PBS NewsHour, 29 Democratic and four Republican senators criticized the tweets. Prime Minister of the United Kingdom Theresa May said in a statement, "it is wrong for the president to have done this" and "Britain First seeks to divide communities through their use of hateful narratives which peddle lies and stoke tensions." Then Foreign Secretary Boris Johnson called Britain First a "hateful" organization which does not reflect British values. However, he did abstain from calling out Trump for sharing the videos.

Trump's sharing of the tweets was praised across far-right circles, increased Islamophobic comment on social media, and elevated the profile of Britain First. In Britain, Fransen and Britain First leader Paul Golding hailed Trump's re-tweets, saying: "Donald Trump himself has retweeted these videos and has around 44 million followers! God Bless You Trump!"

White House press secretary Sarah Huckabee Sanders defended Trump's tweets, saying "Whether it's a real video, the threat is real and that is what the president is talking about." On November 30, 2017, Sanders said that Trump's actions "elevate the conversation to talk about a real issue and a real threat, that's extreme violence and extreme terrorism." Trump responded to criticism from May by publicly rebuking her on Twitter, sparking a rare rift between the United Kingdom and the United States. On December 18, almost three weeks after being retweeted by Trump, the accounts of Britain First, Paul Golding and Jayda Fransen were all suspended by Twitter.

In a January 2018 interview with Piers Morgan for Good Morning Britain, Trump said he was not familiar with Britain First when he retweeted them, stating, "If you are telling me they're horrible people, horrible, racist people, I would certainly apologise if you'd like me to do that."

South Africa 
In August 2018, Trump tweeted that he had asked Secretary of State Mike Pompeo to "closely study the South Africa land and farm seizures and expropriations and the large scale killing of farmers". The tweet was sent shortly after a segment by Fox News where Tucker Carlson claimed that the "racist government of South Africa" was targeting white-owned farms for land reform due to anti-white racism. In response, South Africa's Minister for International Relations and Cooperation Lindiwe Sisulu claimed that Trump was expressing "right-wing ideology" and also added that the South African government had requested an explanation for the tweet from the US chargé d'affaires. The US Embassy in South Africa rebuked Trump's tweet, claiming that there is "no evidence that murders on farms specifically target white people or are politically motivated". There are no reliable figures that suggest that white farmers are at greater risk of being killed than the average South African, and the fact-checking organization Afri-Check claims that "whites are less likely to be murdered than any other race group" in South Africa. The talking point is often used by far-right groups as evidence for a white genocide in South Africa. This has been condemned as false by Genocide Watch.

Katie Hopkins 
In July and August 2019, Trump retweeted British commentator Katie Hopkins. In one of these tweets, Hopkins praised four right-wing politicians: Jair Bolsonaro of Brazil, Matteo Salvini of Italy, Victor Orban of Hungary and Jarosław Kaczyński of Poland. In that same tweet, Hopkins said that, "god-willing/jihadi-failing," she would be alive to see "Boris Johnson in Number 10," "Trump in the White House," and "Netanyahu building Israel". Another comment that Trump retweeted was Hopkins' attack on London mayor Sadiq Khan in which she blamed him for the city's violent crime rate. Twitter permanently suspended Hopkins' account in June 2020 for violating its "Hateful Conduct" policy.

Allusions to violence in May 2020
Trump made violent allusions in two late-night tweets in May 2020. In one message, Trump retweeted a video in which one of his supporters (Couy Griffin, a county commissioner in New Mexico and founder of "Cowboys for Trump") says, "The only good Democrat is a dead Democrat." Griffin subsequently said that he was speaking of a "political death" rather than a literal death, but then spoke of an uprising if Democrats win the election and suggested executing Democrats. Twenty-five hours later, Trump tweeted, in reference to violence in Minneapolis, "When the looting starts, the shooting starts." This message was subsequently flagged by Twitter as "glorifying violence" (see below).

OANN conspiracy theory 

In a tweet on June 9, 2020, Trump falsely claimed that a 75-year-old George Floyd protester in Buffalo, New York, who was knocked to ground by two police officers, "fell harder than he was pushed," and could be an "antifa provocateur." Trump's tweet referred to a conspiracy theory promoted by the far-right One America News Network (OANN) channel and Kristian Rouz of OANN, who has also worked for the Russian propaganda outlet Sputnik News. The OANN claim was itself based on an claim on an anonymous right-wing blog. No evidence supports Trump's claims that the man was an "antifa" member, that the incident was a setup, that the man fell "harder than he was pushed," or that the man was attempting to "scan" police devices.

"White power" video clip
On June 28, 2020, Trump retweeted a video showing profane arguments between anti-Trump and pro-Trump protesters in The Villages, Florida, a retirement community. In the video, a pro-Trump protester can twice be heard yelling "white power" at the anti-Trump protesters. In his tweet, Trump thanked the pro-Trump protesters shown in the video, calling them "great people".

The tweet was widely criticized as racist. Senator Tim Scott of South Carolina (the Senate's sole black Republican) called the tweet "indefensible" and asked Trump to delete it. Trump subsequently deleted the post, without condemning the "white power" statement or disavowing his supporter's act. White House Deputy Press Secretary Judd Deere defended Trump, claiming "President Trump is a big fan of The Villages. He did not hear the one statement made on the video. What he did see was tremendous enthusiasm from his many supporters."

Many White House officials claimed to have tried to reach out to Trump while the tweet was still up asking him to delete it, but that they couldn't reach him because he had put his phone down while playing golf at his Virginia golf club.

Election claims and grievances

2016 campaign: Trump Tower wiretapping allegations

In a succession of tweets on March 4, 2017, Trump stated he had "just found out" that his predecessor Obama had wiretapped the phones in his offices at Trump Tower during the last months of the 2016 election. Trump did not say where he had obtained the information and offered no evidence to support it. Trump compared the alleged intrusion to McCarthyism and Watergate. Anonymous White House officials told The Washington Post that Trump did not appear to coordinate his comments with other White House officials.

Although no evidence supported Trump's claims, the tweets resulted in a week of media attention. Fake news websites also took up the allegations, and one falsely claimed that a warrant for Obama's arrest had been given.

2016 campaign: Investigation into Russian influence 

Trump repeatedly attacked former FBI Director James Comey, whom Trump dismissed from office, via Twitter. Trump has posted a number of angry tweets directed at Robert Mueller, who was appointed as a special prosecutor to investigate Russian interference in the 2016 presidential election.

2020 campaign: Suggestion of delaying election 
On July 30, 2020, Trump claimed that universal mail-in ballots for the 2020 election will lead to widespread fraud. He then suggested that the election should be "delayed"—something that Trump lacked the power to do. Trump's proposal came with widespread backlash from leaders across the political spectrum, including from Democratic House Speaker Nancy Pelosi (who noted that only Congress could change the date of the election) and Senate Republicans who rarely criticized Trump. Later that day, Trump said in a press conference that he does not want to see a delay in the election but repeated his claims about voter fraud.

2020 election: Attempt to overturn results 

On January 5, 2021—the day before Congress convened in joint session to count the electoral votes and formalize Biden's victory in the presidential election—Trump falsely claimed on Twitter that Vice President Mike Pence had the power to toss out "fraudulent" electoral votes.

On January 6, after a violent pro-Trump mob stormed the Capitol and disrupted the counting of electoral votes, Twitter declared that they had indefinitely locked Trump's account for "repeated and severe violations" of the site's Civic Integrity policy. "Locking" meant that Trump could not post new tweets but meanwhile his existing tweets could still be viewed by the public. Twitter Safety said that, if Trump deleted three specific tweets, a 12-hour waiting period would go into effect and then his account would be unlocked. The tweets were immediately deleted. Overnight, while Trump's account was still locked, a message from him was posted to his assistant Dan Scavino's account. In that message, Trump promised "an orderly transition on January 20th" but also emphasized that "I totally disagree with the outcome of the election" and that this moment was "only the beginning of our fight."

Trump would only tweet three more times from his personal account. His next tweet was on January 7 at 7:10 p.m. Eastern; it was a brief video that was widely reported in the news as his concession speech. In the video, he acknowledged that a new administration would be sworn into office and that he would no longer be president. On January 8 at 9:46 a.m. Eastern, he called the people who voted for him "American Patriots", assured they would have a "GIANT VOICE", and affirmed they would not tolerate disrespect. At 10:44 a.m. Eastern, he tweeted "I will not be going to the Inauguration on January 20th." Later that day, Twitter permanently suspended Trump's account, stating that Trump's continued tweeting was "likely to inspire others to replicate the violent acts that took place on January 6, 2021" and that there were "multiple indicators that they are being received and understood as encouragement to do so."

On December 3, 2022, Trump called for "the termination of all rules, regulations, and articles, even those found in the Constitution" to allow him to be declared winner of the 2020 election or to rerun the election. He was complaining about a new revelation that, several weeks before the election, Twitter's corporate policy teams had debated whether to allow distribution of a particular story unfavorable to Biden; a newspaper claimed to have information about a computer belonging to Biden's son, and Twitter leaders had discussed whether it ran afoul of their content rules about "hacked materials." Trump posted his complaint about the U.S. Constitution to his own platform, Truth Social. At this time, Twitter had already reinstated his account, but Trump had not resumed posting to that platform.

Other controversial tweets

Comments on Sadiq Khan

After the 2017 London Bridge attack, Mayor of London Sadiq Khan condemned it and said that "the city remains one of the safest in the world" and there was "no reason to be alarmed" over the increased police presence around the city. The latter comment was taken out of context and criticized by Trump in a tweet: "At least 7 dead and 48 wounded in terror attack and Mayor of London says there is 'no reason to be alarmed!'"

Trump's comments were described as a deliberate misrepresentation of Khan's remarks by Khan's spokesman, as well as by former US vice president Al Gore. Prime Minister Theresa May said that "Sadiq Khan is doing a good job and it is wrong to say anything else". Conservative minister Penny Mordaunt and Liberal Democrat leader Tim Farron also backed Khan. Farron said, "Sadiq Khan has shown calm and dignified resolve in the face of these cowardly terrorist attacks. He is more of a statesman than Donald Trump will ever be." Lewis Lukens, the former US ambassador to the UK, and the United States Conference of Mayors declared their support, with Lukens commending Khan's "strong leadership" in leading London forward after the attack and also praising the "extraordinary response" from the law enforcement community. Trump tweeted the following day that the London Mayor was offering a "pathetic excuse" for his statement, and alleging that the mainstream media were "working hard to sell" Khan's explanation. When asked about these comments following a vigil held near Tower Bridge, Khan stated that he was busy dealing with the aftermath of the attack and declared that he has not "got the time to respond to tweets from Donald Trump".

Trump's sons, Donald Trump Jr. and Eric Trump, defended his comments and claimed that Khan, who worked along with the security services and held a vigil for victims of the attack, was not doing enough to combat terrorism. Trump Jr. stated that Khan should stop attacking his father, despite the fact that Khan did not respond to Trump's comments.

Senator John McCain criticized the comments made by Trump, stating that America was "not showing leadership around the world." During the same discussion, McCain also commented that the former president Barack Obama and his administration had offered better leadership. He later partially retracted by stating that only certain "different aspects" were better during Obama's presidency, but still stood by his criticism of Trump's social media views.

Comments on Morning Joe hosts

On June 29, 2017, Trump tweeted about Morning Joe hosts Mika Brzezinski and Joe Scarborough, who earlier in the day had talked about Trump on their show. The tweets referred to the hosts as "low I.Q. Crazy Mika, along with Psycho Joe", and claimed that Brzezinski tried to join Trump on New Year's Eve but was declined because she was bleeding from a facelift.

The comments were quickly met with condemnation from both the left and the right. Paul Ryan, Speaker of the US House of Representatives, stated, "Obviously, I don't see that as an appropriate comment." Nancy Pelosi, Minority Leader of the House, stated that the tweet "really saddens me because it is so beneath the dignity of the president of the United States to engage in such behavior". Maine Republican Senator Susan Collins tweeted, "This has to stop – we all have a job – 3 branches of gov't and media. We don't have to get along, but we must show respect and civility." Rebukes also came from Oklahoma Republican senator James Lankford, New York Democratic representative Nita Lowey, and Kansas Republican representative Lynn Jenkins.

MSNBC stated, "It's a sad day for America when the president spends his time bullying, lying and spewing petty personal attacks instead of doing his job." Aaron Blake of The Washington Post wrote an article titled "Trump's very bad tweets about Mika Brzezinski are a microcosm of his struggling presidency."

Seemingly in defense of Trump, Melania Trump's spokeswoman Stephanie Grisham released the statement: "As the First Lady has stated publicly in the past, when her husband gets attacked, he will punch back 10 times harder." Sarah Huckabee Sanders stated, "Look, I don't think that the president's ever been someone who gets attacked and doesn't push back. ... This is a president who fights fire with fire and certainly will not be allowed to be bullied by liberal media and the liberal elites in Hollywood or anywhere else."

On July 1, 2017, Trump tweeted "Crazy Joe Scarborough and dumb as a rock Mika are not bad people, but their low rated show is dominated by their NBC bosses. Too bad!"

After these tweets, Trump's approval rating decreased from 40 percent to 37 percent, according to a Gallup poll. However, the RealClearPolitics average of polls showed his approval rating remained virtually unchanged in the same time period.

Joe Scarborough smear 

Trump repeatedly used Twitter to smear Scarborough by falsely suggesting that he was involved in the 2001 death of Lori Klausutis, who had been one of Scarborough's congressional aides. Klausutis died in Scarborough's district office in Fort Walton Beach, Florida, after she fainted and hit her head; the medical examiner's autopsy revealed that she had had an undiagnosed heart condition that caused the death, which occurred when Scarborough was in Washington, and there was no evidence of any foul play. In 2017, Trump suggested that Scarborough to be fired "based on the 'unsolved mystery' that took place in Florida years ago" and wrote "Investigate!" In a series of tweets in May 2020, Trump called Scarborough a "psycho" and again suggested that he had murdered Klausutis.

Twitter refused to delete the tweet, despite a request from Timothy Klausutis, Lori's widower, who in May 2020 wrote a letter to Twitter CEO Jack Dorsey (subsequently published by The New York Times), calling upon Twitter to remove Trump's tweets. Klausutis pointed out that "an ordinary user like me would be banished from the platform for such a tweet" and wrote, "These conspiracy theorists, including most recently the President of the United States, continue to spread their bile and misinformation on your platform disparaging the memory of my wife and our marriage. ... the President of the United States has taken something that does not belong to him — the memory of my dead wife — and perverted it for perceived political gain." Trump's promotion of the debunked conspiracy drew rare rebukes from some Republican officials such as Adam Kinzinger, Liz Cheney, and Mitt Romney. as well as some conservative media outlets, including The Wall Street Journal and the Washington Examiner.

Attacks on federal judges, officials, departments and FBI
As president, Trump frequently tweeted personal attacks against federal judges who have ruled against him in court cases. In February 2017, Trump referred to US district judge James Robart, who had enjoined Trump's travel ban from taking effect, as a "so-called judge" and wrote, "If something happens blame him and court system. People pouring in. Bad!" Legal experts expressed concerns that such comments undermined the federal judiciary and could "undermine public confidence in an institution capable checking his power."

In June 2017, Trump criticized his own United States Department of Justice for defending his "watered down, politically correct version" of a travel ban (which Trump signed in March 2017) in court, rather than an initial version of the ban that Trump has signed in January 2017 (and was later declared unconstitutional by federal courts). In January 2018, Trump tweeted that his Justice Department is part of the American "deep state". In March 2018, Trump tweeted that "there was tremendous leaking, lying and corruption at the highest levels of the FBI, Justice & State" Departments. Previously in December 2017, Trump tweeted that the FBI's "reputation" was at its worst ever after years under James Comey.

In June 2017, Trump tweeted that Deputy Attorney General Rod Rosenstein's investigation of Trump (via a special counsel Robert Mueller) was a "witch hunt". In March 2018, Trump reiterated that the "Mueller probe should never have been started" and was a "WITCH HUNT!"

Trump has tweeted disapproval of Attorney General Jeff Sessions on various occasions.

In October 2017, Trump tweeted that Secretary of State Rex Tillerson was "wasting his time trying to negotiate with" North Korean leader Kim Jong-un. In March 2018, Trump fired Tillerson via a tweet.

In February 2018, after National Security Advisor H. R. McMaster said there was "incontrovertible" evidence that Russia had interfered in the 2016 election, Trump tweeted that McMaster "forgot to say" that the Russians had colluded with the Democrats and that the Russians had not impacted the election results.

Comments on the Squad 

On July 14, 2019, Trump tweeted that certain Democratic congresswomen—freshmen Representatives Alexandria Ocasio-Cortez, Rashida Tlaib, Ayanna Pressley, and Ilhan Omar, an informal grouping known as "the Squad", all of whom have been critical of Trump—should "go back and help fix the totally broken and crime infested places from which they came" rather than criticize the American government. Trump's tweet was widely described as racist.

Ocasio-Cortez, Tlaib, and Pressley are all native-born citizens of the United States, and Omar has been a naturalized citizen since 2000. Trump's "go back" Tweet was an example of false attribution of foreignness. House speaker Nancy Pelosi described Trump's tweets as xenophobic. Several Republican senators and representatives condemned Trump's tweets as xenophobic and not representative of the party's values and requested that he disavow them. Two days after Trump's tweet, the House of Representatives voted 240–187 to condemn Trump's "racist comments"; all Democrats voted to pass the resolution of condemnation, but only 4 of the 197 House Republicans joined them. Many white nationalists/white supremacists praised Trump's tweet. Commentators pointed out that during the campaign, Trump had criticized America in far stronger terms than those now used by Squad members. Trump's remarks were condemned by many world leaders including Canadian prime minister Justin Trudeau (who said that the comments were "hurtful, wrong and completely unacceptable"), German Chancellor Angela Merkel (who expressed "solidarity with the attacked women"), and president of the European Council Donald Tusk ("sometimes if you feel that something is totally unacceptable you have to react despite business, despite interests").

Trump denied that his tweets were racist and did not apologize for his remarks, saying at a White House press conference, "If somebody has a problem with our country, if someone doesn't want to be in our country, they should leave."

In August 2019, Trump tweeted that Omar and Tlaib resolutely "hate Israel & all Jewish people", and that Israel permitting them to visit the country would "show great weakness". Less than two hours later, Israel blocked the entry of Omar and Tlaib, which was a reversal from statements made in July 2019 by Israeli Ambassador to the United States Ron Dermer. Spokesmen for Israeli ministers did not cite Trump as contributing to the blockage. Trump applauded Israel's decision while continuing his criticism of Omar and Tlaib; he described them as "the face of the Democrat Party, and they HATE Israel".

Retweeting Jeffrey Epstein conspiracy theory

In August 2019, after the death of Jeffrey Epstein, Trump retweeted a video from right-wing comedian Terrence K. Williams that baselessly accused the Clintons of murdering Epstein. Trump's promotion of false conspiracy theories was condemned; US Senator Cory Booker of New Jersey, then a candidate for the Democratic presidential nomination, warned that Trump's "whipping people into anger" could lead to violence. Trump defended the retweet, calling Williams "a highly respected conservative pundit" and then repeated his suggestion that the Clintons might have murdered Epstein.

"Liberate" tweets

During the COVID-19 pandemic, several people protested the lockdowns and demanded that states be reopened. On April 17, Trump tweeted calling for the "liberation" of Michigan, Minnesota, and Virginia in all caps. The tweets were widely criticized and "Liberate America" soon trended on Twitter after Trump's remarks.

Retweeting unlicensed Linkin Park song 
In July 2020, Linkin Park issued a cease and desist letter to Donald Trump for retweeting a campaign video that featured an unlicensed song. Twitter soon disabled the video.

Calling Trending on Twitter section illegal

On July 27, 2020, Trump criticized the Twitter Trending section for spreading trends that negatively portrayed him, calling it "really ridiculous, illegal, and, of course, very unfair!" Many Twitter users condemned this tweet, claiming that users were simply exercising First Amendment rights. In response to the tweet, "#TrumpleThinSkin" and "#ThePresidentIsACrybaby" became trending hashtags in the United States.

Tweets on illegal immigrants
In an effort to press his campaign for the border wall between the US and Mexico, Trump repeatedly posted tweets seeking "to paint a portrait of widespread criminal conduct by undocumented immigrants." His tweets on illegal immigration contained nonsensical and exaggerated figures, and lacked significant context. For example, in January 2019, Trump complained that "the cost of illegal immigration" for the four weeks of the year "is $18,959,495,168" and that the "at least 25,772,342 illegal aliens" were in the US; neither claim was accurate, and the administration did not respond to requests to explain these figures. In other tweets, Trump exaggerated the percentage of federal prison inmates who were unauthorized immigrants and the number of the illegal border-crossings (which had been declining for almost 20 years by the time Trump took office). Trump also seized upon high-profile crimes committed by illegal immigrants, such as Wilbur Ernesto Martinez-Guzman, Gustavo Arriaga Perez, and Cristhian Bahena Rivera.

Tweets about the American suburbs
On July 23, 2020, Trump tweeted that the "suburban housewives of America" must read an article from the New York Post, claiming that his Democratic rival Joe Biden would "destroy your neighborhood and the American dream" if elected.

Also in July 2020, the Trump administration had made changes to the Affirmatively Furthering Fair Housing implemented by the Obama administration. This act mandated local communities to fix any prejudices regarding building low-income housing before receiving federal funds. Trump tweeted that "people living their Suburban Lifestyle Dream" would "no longer be bothered" by low-income housing being built in their communities.

Spread of COVID-19 misinformation

On October 5, 2020, Trump tweeted that he would be leaving Walter Reed Army Medical Center, 3 days after being admitted after testing positive for COVID-19, writing "Don't be afraid of Covid. Don't let it dominate your life. We have developed, under the Trump Administration, some really great drugs & knowledge. I feel better than I did 20 years ago!" Trump's tweet undermined public health messaging and encouraged followers to disregard recommendations to prevent the spread of COVID-19. Scientific, medical, public health, and ethical experts, pandemic survivors, and the families those killed by COVID-19 expressed horror and dismay at Trump's attempt to downplay the COVID-19 pandemic in the United States, which at the time of Trump's tweet had killed at least 210,000 Americans.

In Twitter and Facebook posts early the next morning, Trump falsely claimed that seasonal flu was more lethal than COVID-19; Twitter placed a warning message over the tweet, while Facebook deleted it entirely, based on the sites' policies against the spread of COVID-19 misinformation. Several hours later, Trump reacted by tweeting: "REPEAL SECTION 230!!!"—a reference to section 230 of Title 47 of the US Code, which immunizes technology companies from liability for moderation decisions.

Other notable tweets

Announcing positive test for COVID
Trump's public statement in the form of a tweet announcing he tested positive for coronavirus was his most-liked tweet ever.

"Covfefe"

On May 31, 2017, Trump sent a tweet that read, in its entirety, "Despite the constant negative press covfefe". It immediately went viral as an Internet meme and a source of jokes. It got over 127,000 retweets and 162,000 likes, making it one of Trump's most popular tweets in months. Six hours later, Trump deleted it and issued a new tweet asking what people thought  might mean.

Off-camera, at a press briefing later the same day, White House press secretary Sean Spicer explained that "the president and a small group of people know exactly what he meant". No further explanation was given during the briefing. Some reporters said that Spicer did not appear to be joking. Conservative columnist Jonah Goldberg suggested in the National Review that "Spicer feels compelled to protect the myth of Trumpian infallibility at all costs". The Atlantic Megan Garber felt that Spicer's response further divided the White House from the public by unnecessarily creating a "whiff of conspiracy" around a likely typo. At The Washington Post, Callum Borchers argued that Spicer's response had been deliberately obscure to distract the public from other controversies.

Leonid Bershidsky, writing for Bloomberg View, compared the phenomenon to President Ronald Reagan's joke on a live microphone, "We begin bombing in five minutes." Bill Coffin of Compliance Week compared the two incidents: "In Reagan's case, he immediately admitted the error and squashed it. In Trump's case, he sent a wrong message and then allowed it to sit for hours untended."

About a year later, on May 17, 2018, Trump jokingly said "I hear covfefe" in response to the Yanny or Laurel meme.

Tweets during first impeachment
Trump made several controversial tweets during his impeachment inquiry, first impeachment by the House (December 2019), and first Senate trial and acquittal (February 2020).

"Civil War" tweet

In a late September 2019 tweet, Trump controversially quoted Texas pastor Robert Jeffress, who stated that if Trump was removed from office, it would cause a "Civil War like fracture, from which this country would never heal". His comments were criticized by Senator Kamala Harris (Democrat of California), who urged Twitter to suspend Trump's account, and Representative Adam Kinzinger (Republican of Illinois), who called it "beyond repugnant." Harvard Law School professor John Coates argued that "a sitting president threatening civil war if Congress exercises its constitutionally authorized power" constituted an independent ground for impeachment. Mary B. McCord of Georgetown University Law School, a former Justice Department national security official, said that armed militia-movement groups were likely to take Trump's "civil war" tweets seriously. #CivilWar2 trended on Twitter soon after Trump's tweet.

Threats against Representative Adam Schiff and whistleblower
Trump repeatedly used Twitter to attack and threaten US Representative Adam Schiff, the chairman of the House Intelligence Committee, who led the investigation into the Trump–Ukraine scandal and served as the lead House impeachment manager during Trump's Senate trial. In a September 30, 2019, tweet, Trump suggested that Schiff be arrested for treason. In a January 26, 2020, tweet, during his Senate trial, Trump called Schiff "a CORRUPT POLITICIAN, and probably a very sick man" who "has not paid the price, yet, for what he has done to our Country!" When asked about the apparent veiled threat on Meet the Press, Schiff said he believed that Trump intended to threaten him and said that Trump was a "wrathful and vindictive president" who "wants to at least give the suggestion that the retribution should be of a kind other than at the ballot box."

Trump also repeatedly used Twitter to attack and threaten the whistleblower who submitted a report to the Intelligence Community inspector general about Trump's conduct; Trump also used Twitter to spread conspiracy theories about the whistleblower. In December 2019, Trump retweeted a link to an unconfirmed Washington Examiner story that purported to identify the whistleblower, although whistle-blowers' identifies are protected by federal law. Trump was criticized for this.

Lynching tweet
In late October 2019, Trump tweeted that the impeachment inquiry against him was "a lynching" and that he lacked "due process or fairness or any legal rights." The tweet, and especially its racially charged language, drew widespread backlash, with Democrats condemning the remarks and some Republicans issuing mild criticism. (House Minority Leader Kevin McCarthy called it "not the language I would use" and Senate Majority Leader Mitch McConnell called it an "unfortunate choice of words.") Some Republicans supported Trump's comparison to a "lynching" or defended his comments, such as Senator Lindsey Graham of South Carolina and Congressman Jim Jordan of Ohio.

Blocking of Twitter users

The @realDonaldTrump account has blocked an unknown number of Twitter accounts from viewing his Twitter feed, including individuals such as Rosie O'Donnell, Anne Rice, Chrissy Teigen, Stephen King, Bess Kalb, Andy Signore, Angelo Carusone, Laura Packard and Daniel Dale, and organizations such as VoteVets.org.

In July 2017, a lawsuit was brought by the Knight First Amendment Institute at Columbia University in the US District Court for the Southern District of New York. The plaintiffs were seven Twitter users – Philip N. Cohen, Eugene Gu, Holly Figueroa O'Reilly, Nicholas Pappas, Joseph M. Papp, Rebecca Buckwalter-Poza, and Brandon Neely – whose accounts had been blocked by Trump's personal Twitter account, alleging that the @realDonaldTrump account constitutes a public forum. The lawsuit argued that blocking access to the @realDonaldTrump account is a violation of constitutional rights and a violation of the plaintiff's First Amendment rights. The lawsuit also named as defendants White House press secretary Sean Spicer and social media director Dan Scavino.

In 2018, Judge Naomi Reice Buchwald ruled that the plaintiffs "were indisputably blocked as a result of viewpoint discrimination"; that elements of @realDonaldTrump constitute a public forum; and that viewpoint discrimination in those elements that are public forums violated the First Amendment. After this ruling, the 7 Twitter users that were a part of the lawsuit were unblocked. In August, the Knight First Amendment Institute sent a letter to the US Justice Department requesting that the President comply with the Judge's ruling and unblock a list of 41 additional Twitter users, including Danny Zuker, MoveOn activist Jordan Uhl, health care activist Laura Packard, and journalists like Alex Kotch and Jules Suzdaltsev. Those users were then unblocked by @realDonaldTrump.

In 2019, the Second Circuit upheld Buchwald's ruling, stating that because Trump has conducted official government business over Twitter, he cannot block Americans from the account based on viewpoint.

In July 2020, The Knight First Amendment Institute at Columbia University sued Donald Trump again, on behalf of users that were blocked before Trump's inauguration, or who were not able to identify which tweet prompted Trump to block them.

Trump petitioned the Supreme Court in August 2020 to hear his appeal of the Second Circuit's decision to uphold Judge Buchwald's opinion. Trump's petition requested the Supreme Court to answer the question "Whether the First Amendment deprives a government official of his right to control his personal Twitter account by blocking third-party accounts if he uses that personal account in part to announce official actions and policies." Post-election, this case is still pending before the Supreme Court.

Effects on litigation
Trump's statements in tweets have been cited in court challenges against his actions as president; his Twitter posts on Muslims have been significant in legal challenges to Executive Order 13769 (which Trump has called a "travel ban"), as courts have considered Trump's statements in their assessments of the motivations and purpose of the order. In 2017, Trump's tweets were cited by both the US Court of Appeals for the Fourth Circuit and the US Court of Appeals for the Ninth Circuit, which upheld rulings blocking Trump's executive order as unconstitutional. In its opinion, the Fourth Circuit cited the "backdrop of public statements by the President and his advisers and representatives" as evidence that the order "drips with religious intolerance, animus, and discrimination"; the Ninth Circuit wrote that "throughout these judicial proceedings, the president has continued to make generalized, often inflammatory, statements about the Muslim faith and its adherents," including through Tweets. Peter J. Spiro, a legal scholar at Temple University, noted that Trump's November 2017 tweets of anti-Muslim videos would almost certainly be cited by challengers to Trump's third version of a travel ban as evidence that the orders were unconstitutionally motivated by anti-Muslim animus.

Trump's tweets were also cited by the US District Court for the District of Columbia in its ruling in Jane Doe v. Trump issuing a preliminary injunction blocking Trump's ban on service by transgender people in the military from going into effect. The court determined that Trump's sudden policy announcement on Twitter comment undermined his claim that the ban was motivated by genuine concern for military efficiency. The court wrote: [Trump] abruptly announced, via Twitter – without any of the formality or deliberative processes that generally accompany the development and announcement of major policy changes that will gravely affect the lives of many Americans – that all transgender individuals would be precluded from participating in the military in any capacity. These circumstances provide additional support for Plaintiffs' claim that the decision to exclude transgender individuals was not driven by genuine concerns regarding military efficacy.

Effects on the stock market

On December 22, 2016, Trump posted: "Based on the tremendous cost and cost overruns of the Lockheed Martin F-35, I have asked Boeing to price-out a comparable F-18 Super Hornet!" After this post, the stocks of Lockheed Martin dropped significantly and the stock price of Boeing increased slightly. Another example is the on August 17, 2017, post on Amazon: "Amazon is doing great damage to tax paying retailers. Towns, cities and states throughout the U.S. are being hurt – many jobs being lost!" Afterwards, the market capitalization of Amazon declined by $6 billion. However, there are also contrary examples: The New York Times stock remained stable or even rose when Trump posted about 'failing The New York Times.'

On August 19, 2020, Trump called for a boycott for Goodyear Tires on Twitter after an image of a Goodyear employee training leaked displaying a slide showing that "Black Lives Matter" and LGBT gear are allowed to be worn, however, "Blue Lives Matter" and "MAGA" gear are not allowed to be worn. Goodyear stock fell six percent shortly after the tweet. In addition, stocks from several of Goodyear's rivals, such as Bridgestone, gained value. Goodyear later released a statement stating that the Goodyear corporation did not create the slide and asked all employees to remain apolitical.

Deletion of tweets

While the National Archives and Records Administration has recommended archiving all social media postings to comply with the Presidential Records Act, the Trump administration has deleted multiple public posts. In June 2017, the watchdog group CREW and the National Security Archive filed suit against Trump, contending that deletion of tweets is the destruction of presidential records in violation of the Presidential Records Act of 1981.

Following Alabama senator Luther Strange's loss to Justice Roy Moore in the September 2017 primary for the Senate special election, Trump deleted at least two tweets previously posted in support of Strange. In November 2017, following criticism from the office of the British Prime Minister regarding Trump's retweeting of several videos from far-right British nationalist group Britain First (see ), Trump tweeted at Twitter user @theresamay, while presumably intending to target @theresa_may; Trump later deleted the original tweet, and sent a new tweet targeting @theresa_may with the same content.

Caution on tweets 
Under its "civic integrity" policy created in 2018 and expanded in May 2020, Twitter scrutinizes statements that may affect participation in democracy. Twitter has invited certain nonprofits to flag problematic tweets in this subject area. Twitter also announced on May 11 that it would begin to flag "misleading information." In November 2020, Twitter clarified that, while it may choose to merely flag the offensive tweets of "current world leaders and candidates for office," when those people leave office and become "private citizens" again, they will be treated like everyone else and their accounts can be suspended.

"Get the facts about mail-in ballots" 
Twitter placed a fact-check advisory on Trump's tweets for the first time on May 26, 2020. That morning, in two tweets, Trump alleged that mail-in ballots would be "substantially fraudulent," resulting in a "Rigged Election." Hours later, Twitter placed an exclamation-point icon on each of these tweets with the text "Get the facts about mail-in ballots," linking to a page that said that Trump's allegations of fraud were "unsubstantiated". This type of fact-checking moderation had been introduced earlier in response to misinformation spread during the COVID-19 pandemic to help Twitter users get correct information, and was the first time Twitter staff opted to use it on Trump's tweets.

In response, on May 28, Trump signed an executive order challenging the liability protections currently given to social media platforms. Section 230 of the Communications Decency Act, sometimes referred to as "the 26 words that created the internet", treats social media companies as "platforms" rather than "publishers" and thereby reduces their responsibility for what their users say. Trump sought to increase the legal responsibility of social media companies for what their users say, thereby exposing them to lawsuits. Experts challenged the legality of many sections of the executive order as running afoul of the First Amendment, as well as making demands of independent agencies of the United States government that are statutorily outside presidential control.

"Glorifying violence" 

Protests broke out in Minneapolis and throughout the United States after the May 25 murder of George Floyd, an African-American man, by Derek Chauvin, a white Minneapolis police officer. Trump, in both Twitter and Facebook posts in the late evening on May 28, said he had talked to Minnesota governor Tim Walz about bringing the National Guard to help secure the city. He said the government was prepared to "assume control." "When the looting starts, the shooting starts," Trump warned, using a phrase made infamous by Miami Police Chief Walter E. Headley in 1967 that was believed to have inflamed violence in that city. Twitter decided to mark the tweet with a "public interest notice" deeming it as "glorifying violence"; they acknowledged they could have removed the tweet entirely but maintained that "it is important that the public still be able to see the Tweet given its relevance to ongoing matters of public importance." Facebook opted to take no action about the equivalent post made on its platform; CEO Mark Zuckerberg said that this message and similar ones did not violate Facebook's acceptable use policies. Journalists and civil rights leaders criticized the company's standards, and Facebook employees staged a virtual walkout on June 1 to demand that management deal with Trump's posts.

Several days later the White House Twitter account posted a series of videos falsely accusing antifa groups of placing bricks on sidewalks in order to instigate violence during the protests, including one which falsely suggested a barrier situated outside a synagogue in Sherman Oaks, California, to prevent anti-Semitic attacks had been placed on the street by terrorists. Trump also used Twitter to share a letter by his former legal advisor John M. Dowd, which described peaceful protesters in Washington, DC, as "terrorists".

A tweet posted by Trump's reelection campaign on June 5, 2020 (as well as posted to other social media sites), in the wake of the Floyd protests had included a video with several segments of Trump speaking about Floyd's murder, along with several other images. Twitter was forced to remove the video after it had received a Digital Millennium Copyright Act (DMCA) takedown request for one of the images used in the video though it was unclear to journalists which image this was. Trump called out the action as "illegal" in a following tweet but Jack Dorsey of Twitter reiterated that they had to follow the DMCA in removing the video.

"Manipulated media" 
On June 18, 2020, Trump tweeted a satirical video with the CNN logo and the chyron caption "Terrified todler  runs from racist baby; racist baby probably a Trump voter." The implication was that news organizations unfairly malign white people and conservatives. CNN had never run that caption. Twitter applied a fact-check advisory with the words "manipulated media."

"Abusive behavior" 
On June 23, 2020, Trump tweeted that protesters "will be met with serious force." Twitter applied a warning that the comment "violated the Twitter Rules about abusive behavior."

"Misleading health claims" 
On August 23, 2020, Trump tweeted that "Mail Drop Boxes...are not Covid sanitized." He claimed that the Democratic Party was "using" mailboxes despite alleged "voter security" and "fraud" problems with postal voting; he claimed that voting by mail enables "a person to vote multiple times," and he questioned "who controls" mailboxes. Twitter applied a warning that the comment violated "our Civic Integrity Policy for making misleading health claims that could potentially dissuade people from participation in voting."

"Misleading about an election" 
Twitter applied a warning to over a third of Trump's tweets made between election night 2020 (November 3) and his rival Joe Biden's victory speech (November 7), stating: "some or all of the content shared in this Tweet is disputed and might be misleading about an election or other civic process." Twitter then said it would no longer use this election-specific flag given that the election had already been decided.

Suspensions and deactivations

2017 
Trump's personal Twitter account was deactivated for eleven minutes on November 2, 2017. The official @POTUS account remained online during the period that the personal account was taken offline. The Twitter employee who deactivated the account was Bahtiyar Duysak, who deactivated the account on his last day of work before returning to his home country of Germany. In a tweet the next day, Trump referred to him as a "rogue employee." Twitter responded by adding protection to Trump's account.

2021 

On January 6, 2021, shortly after Trump uploaded a video message in which he repeated the false claims that the presidential election had been stolen, the video was removed by Twitter, Facebook, and YouTube for violating site policies on "civil integrity" and election misinformation. Facebook executive Guy Rosen said the video was removed because "it contributes to rather than diminishes the risk of ongoing violence." Twitter locked Trump's account for twelve hours and threatened a permanent suspension for "repeated and severe violations of our Civic Integrity policy." Twitter also required him to remove three of his tweets. He was warned his account would be terminated if he continued to make posts they deemed as inciting violence, or spread conspiracy theories about election integrity (false claims which were said to be fuelling the violence). His account was unlocked, and he tweeted three more times from it. Snapchat indefinitely suspended Trump's account on the platform the same day, while Shopify terminated shops that sold Trump campaign paraphernalia and merchandise from his personal TrumpStore brand.

The following day, Facebook and its platforms, including Instagram, announced they had banned Trump indefinitely, at least until the end of his presidential term. Facebook CEO Mark Zuckerberg wrote, "The shocking events of the last 24 hours clearly demonstrate that President Donald Trump intends to use his remaining time in office to undermine the peaceful and lawful transition of power to his elected successor." On January 7, Twitch announced it had disabled Trump's channel on the platform. TikTok announced it would restrict videos of the Capitol attack and Trump's January6 address, other than those providing factual information, criticism or journalistic value. Pinterest began limiting hashtags related to pro-Trump topics such as #StopTheSteal since around the November election.

On January 12, YouTube announced that it had temporarily banned Trump's channel for seven days, restricting it from uploading any new videos or live-streams. YouTube said the decision came after the president violated the platform's policies by posting content that incited violence. All the previous content on the channel was removed. YouTube also said that the ban could be extended.

A Zignal Labs analysis determined that in the week after several social media sites (Twitter, Facebook, Instagram, Snapchat, Twitch, Spotify, Shopify, and others) suspended Trump's and key allies' accounts, online misinformation about election fraud plunged 73 percent, dropping from 2.5 million mentions to 688,000 mentions.

Reactions to Trump's suspension
Civil rights groups said that Trump's Twitter and Facebook bans were "long overdue" and that social media companies had excessively delayed in taking steps to counter political violence. The co-CEO of the civil rights and advocacy group Free Press said the bans were "a day late and a dollar short" but welcomed the move. Many Democratic officials welcomed the ban. Yaël Eisenstat, a former CIA officer who previously worked on election policy at Facebook, said: "I'm not going to applaud the move now when it is politically the most obvious, easy and – let's be frank – good business decision. Inciting your followers to engage in insurrection is a high form of treason and allowing your platform to be used for that purpose makes you complicit." The ban was also criticised by many US officials supportive of Trump, with Republican senator Ted Cruz stating the ban was "absurd and profoundly dangerous", and former United States Ambassador to the United Nations Nikki Haley likening the ban to political censorship in China.

A survey of Americans taken after the Capitol attack and Twitter's permanent suspension of Trump's account showed that 61 percent agreed with the decision to ban Trump, while 39 percent were opposed. Support was sharply split by party: 80 percent of Democrats, 59 percent of independents, and 36 percent of Republicans supported the ban. Of those surveyed, 58 percent agreed with the statement "President Trump's actions this week were dangerous and removing him from Twitter was the correct thing to do", while 42 percent agreed with the statement "I am concerned that Twitter permanently suspending President Trump sets a dangerous precedent with technology companies censoring free speech and government officials."

Some foreign leaders criticized Twitter's ban of Trump. A spokesman for German Chancellor Angela Merkel said that Twitter was correct to flag false statements in Trump's posts, but that she viewed the permanent suspension as "problematic" due to her view that restrictions on the "right to freedom of opinion" should be decided by governments rather than private companies. Mexican President Andrés Manuel López Obrador blasted the decision to ban Trump, saying that he favored prohibiting private companies from banning government officials and had directed officials to explore the possibility of creating a Mexican state-run social network; López Obrador compared such action by websites to the "Spanish Inquisition" while Polish Prime Minister Mateusz Morawiecki said that Poland's conservative government planned to introduce a bill to limit how social media companies could moderate content. However, Margrethe Vestager, the Executive Vice President of the European Commission for A Europe Fit for the Digital Age, suggested that the bans were justifiable, saying: "This is, of course, the most extreme of extreme situations, that the president of the United States is inciting people to go toward Congress. So I completely accept that this is an extreme situation, and lines have been crossed."

According to the South China Morning Post, Chinese state media commentators and academics have also criticized Trump being banned from social media platforms, calling the bans "a cautionary tale of social media platforms wielding too much power" and have also claimed "that the ban hypocritically goes against US advocacy of free speech."

Satire and memes
In June 2017, the satirical news program The Daily Show and its network, Comedy Central, set up a temporary museum space on West 57th Street, next to Trump Tower in Manhattan, that was dedicated to Trump's tweets.

In January 2019, Trump served hamburgers to the Clemson Tigers champion football team due to the White House's catering staff being furloughed during the federal government shutdown of 2018–2019. His misspelling on Twitter of hamburger as "hamberder" was ridiculed on the internet. It soon became a meme as well, and was parodied on Saturday Night Live with Trump (played by Alec Baldwin) competing for "hamberders" on the Deal or No Deal game show.

Archival
In June 2017, Democratic US Representative Mike Quigley filed legislation in the United States House of Representatives, titled the Communications Over Various Feeds Electronically for Engagement (COVFEFE) Act (H.R. 2883), to Presidential Records Act to cover social media, thus requiring tweets and other social media posts by the US president to be preserved under law and stored by the National Archives. The bill did not advance in committee and died at the end of the 115th Congress.

Reactions and analysis
Some commentators view Trump's tweets as having either the purpose or effect of distracting from issues. Such tweets are sometimes described as "shiny objects" intended to divert attention from other news. Dan Mahaffee of the Center for the Study of the Presidency and Congress opined that Trump's tweets distracted from pressing national issues, writing that to dismiss Trump's tweets "as intemperate outbursts or merely stream-of-consciousness responses to current events would thus greatly underestimate their impact and reach" and opining that Trump's tweets elevated "the trivial at the expense of the consequential." Financial Times columnist Courtney Weaver viewed Trump's Twitter attacks against NFL players kneeling during the national anthem as "weapons of mass distraction" that diverted attention from the humanitarian crisis in Puerto Rico following Hurricane Maria, and wrote that "The more time that is spent discussing the president's latest stand-off with the NFL, the less time is spent discussing the Republicans' latest failed efforts to repeal and replace Obamacare, and other administration shortcomings." Analyst Philip Bump of The Washington Post views Trump's Tweets as attempts to distract in times of unfavorable news related to the investigation by special counsel Robert S. Mueller III.

A 2020 study published in Nature Communications assessed Trump's tweets in the context of agenda-setting theory, analyzing the hypothesis that Trump uses tweets strategically to divert the attention of the media and the public from issues and topics he considers to be potentially threatening or harmful to him. The research found that increased media coverage of Russian interference in the 2016 election and the Mueller investigation was "immediately followed by Trump tweeting increasingly about unrelated issues" which led to "a reduction in coverage of the Mueller investigation," providing support for the diversionary hypothesis. The research found that this pattern was "absent in placebo analyses involving Brexit coverage and several other topics that do not present a political risk to the president" and that the finding was "robust to the inclusion of numerous control variables and examination of several alternative explanations, although the generality of the successful diversion must be established by further investigation."

Essayist Frank Rich of New York magazine argued in 2017 that Trump's tweets are not purely distractions, but rather (1) are frequently news in themselves; (2) indicate a heightened instability within the Trump administration; and (3) are not aimed at news consumers, but rather "are intended to rally his base" of supporters.

In a February 2021 analysis, Michael Humphrey, a journalism and communications professor at Colorado State University, wrote that Trump's tweets were characterized by an emphasis on storytelling and "re-scripting" the world, and were based on five themes: "The true version of the United States is beset with invaders"; "Real Americans can see this"; "I (Trump) am uniquely qualified to stop this invasion"; "The establishment and its agents are hindering me"; and "The U.S. is in mortal danger because of this." Because these elements were flexible, "the establishment" and "the invaders" could be anyone. Trump's tweets were also marked by contradiction: for example, he depicted China variously as a partner and then a foe.

SuspendThePres
SuspendThePres, also known as Will They Suspend Me?, is a Twitter account created by Bizzare Lazar. The account re-posted every tweet by Donald Trump. The account was suspended and flagged multiple times. There is also a SuspendThePres account on Facebook. The Twitter account was created back in 2015, but only started posting on May 29, 2020. The Facebook account was created on June 4. Less than three days after the Twitter account started, it was suspended for 12 hours. The account was suspended a second time for another 12 hours. One of the posts on the Facebook account was censored, but later restored.

Permanent suspension 

Trump was indefinitely banned from Twitter on January 8, 2021, at 6:21 p.m. EST. According to Twitter, Trump was suspended "due to the risk of further incitement of violence" from his tweets, writing that specific tweets by Trump that "are likely to inspire others to replicate the violent acts that took place on January 6, 2021, and that there are multiple indicators that they are being received and understood as encouragement to do so." The company also noted: "Plans for future armed protests have already begun proliferating on and off-Twitter, including a proposed secondary attack on the US Capitol and state capitol buildings on January 17, 2021." Twitter's decision came after his account had been locked for 12-hour intervals twice and after he had had three of his tweets removed during the 2021 United States Capitol attack. The suspension caused Trump to lose over 88 million followers. In his final tweet before the permanent ban, Trump announced that he would not attend the inauguration of Joe Biden on January 20, 2021.

Twitter said it would not ban government accounts like @POTUS or @WhiteHouse, but would "take action to limit their use"; the company said that sock puppet accounts created for Trump in an attempt to evade the ban would be permanently suspended "at first detection". Trump attempted to circumvent the ban on January 8 by using the @POTUS account, but his posts were deleted within minutes. Trump also tried to circumvent the suspension by posting a statement on his official campaign Twitter account @TeamTrump, in which he complained about Twitter's suspension and accused the social media platform, without evidence, of colluding in a conspiracy with the Democratic Party and "the Radical Left" to get him banned, while repeating the rhetoric that first got him banned from his main Twitter account. This account was also suspended after the statement from Trump was posted. Twitter also suspended Trump campaign digital director Gary Coby's account after he forwarded his account information to Trump's deputy chief of staff, Dan Scavino, in an attempt to transfer it for Trump's use.

On January 14, then-CEO of Twitter Jack Dorsey defended banning Trump, but also said it "sets a precedent I feel is dangerous".

On January 20, 2021, shortly before noon, the @POTUS account was transferred to Biden as planned and the follower count of @POTUS was reset.

On February 10, 2021, Twitter CFO Ned Segal said in an interview with CNN that the ban of the Twitter account is permanent, even if Trump runs for office again.

In March 2021, the CEOs of Alphabet, Twitter, and Facebook were set to appear before a House panel to be questioned about social media platforms' involvement in the US Capitol attack and their following decision to remove or ban Trump from their platforms. The hearing related to Section 230, a controversial law that gives large technology companies power to determine what information is allowed on their platforms.

On May 6, 2021, Twitter suspended an account named "From the desk of Donald J. Trump", also the name of a blog started by Trump the same week. Twitter ruled it a ban evasion.

On July 7, 2021, Trump filed a class action lawsuit against Twitter and its CEO. On October 1, 2021, Trump requested a preliminary injunction to force Twitter to reinstate his account. In February 2022, a hearing was held in the case Trump v. Twitter, in the US District Court for the Northern District of California, San Francisco. Twitter requested at this hearing that the lawsuit be dismissed. Federal judge James Donato dismissed the case on May 6, 2022, citing a "failure to plausibly state a claim".

On April 25, 2022, after Elon Musk announced his planned acquisition of Twitter, Trump said he would not return to Twitter and would instead remain on his own social media platform, Truth Social. However, Truth Social seemed to be planning for a different outcome. On May 10, Musk said he would lift Twitter's ban on Trump, and Truth Social's federal securities filing on May 16 stated that Truth Social would have first dibs on any non-political posts by Trump for a period of six hours, after which Trump would be allowed to post the same content to other platforms like Twitter. When Musk completed his acquisition of Twitter on October 27, it appeared he was still considering reinstating Trump's account. On November 2, he said he would need "at least a few more weeks" to set a "clear process" for reinstating accounts.

Reinstatement

On November 19, 2022, Twitter CEO Elon Musk posted a tweet with an open-access poll asking users if Trump should be reinstated on the platform. The poll ran for 24 hours and ended with around 52% of over 15 million respondents voting "Yes" to reinstate Trump's account.

On November 20, 2022, Musk announced on Twitter that he would reinstate Trump's account, citing the Latin phrase Vox populi, vox Dei ("The voice of the people is the voice of God") and subsequently lifted the suspension on Trump's account. However, even after the reinstatement, Trump said that he would remain on his own platform Truth Social and not return to Twitter.

Other social media platforms

Facebook and Instagram

Banned from both platforms 
Once a prolific user, Donald Trump was blocked from posting new content to Facebook and Instagram from January 6, 2021 to February 7, 2023.

On January 6, 2021, amidst an attack at the Capitol while Congress was counting the electoral votes, Trump posted a short video. Facebook removed it and blocked Trump's ability to post new content to both platforms. Facebook's vice president of integrity, Guy Rosen, explained that the video "contributes to rather than diminishes the risk of ongoing violence." (YouTube also removed the same video. Twitter at first disabled comments; later, the Tweet was deleted.) The next day, Facebook said the block would remain at least until the end of Trump's term on January 20. On May 5, 2021, after considering whether to reinstate Trump's account, Facebook's Oversight Board upheld Trump's suspensions on Facebook and Instagram but instructed Facebook, Inc. to reassess the indefinite ban within six months, stating that "it is not permissible for Facebook to keep a user off the platform for an undefined period, with no criteria for when or whether the account will be restored." One month later, Facebook decided to extend Trump's ban to two years, as his actions "merit the highest penalty available under the new enforcement protocols," and reconsider his case no earlier than January 7, 2023. On July 7, 2021, Trump filed a class action lawsuit against Facebook, Google and Twitter, asserting they had engaged in "illegal, shameful censorship of the American people." Legal experts said the suit had little chance of success.

On February 7, 2023, Meta reinstated Trump on Facebook and Instagram, having announced two weeks earlier that the risk to public safety had "sufficiently receded." Meta said there would be “new guardrails in place to deter repeat offenses" and that Trump could be banned for up to two years at a time in the future if he reoffends.

On March 17, 2023, Trump made his first Facebook post since his reinstatement: a video clip of himself on the day of the 2016 presidential election in which he stated, "Sorry to keep you waiting. Complicated business. Complicated."

Facebook 
During his 2016 campaign, Trump posted a number of ads on his Facebook page attacking Hillary Clinton. The ads included parodies of Pokémon Go and Ms. Pac-Man, portraying Hillary Clinton as a Pokémon and as Ms. Pac-Man. Trump was charged less per ad than Clinton was, Wired claimed, but Facebook countered that Trump had been charged more.

Trump also used the platform to issue an apology for the Access Hollywood tape. As president, he was criticized for posting a news story about a purported Kuwaiti travel ban similar to Executive Order 13769; Kuwait's foreign minister confirmed that no such ban existed.

In 2017, Facebook briefed the House and Senate committees in their investigations of Russian interference in the US election. At the hearings, Facebook revealed that accounts linked to the Russian government had bought approximately $100,000 of Facebook advertisements during the election campaign. In response, Trump criticized Facebook in a series of tweets on September 27, 2017. "Facebook was always anti-Trump," he said, simultaneously extending the same criticism to "the Networks," The New York Times, and The Washington Post. Facebook CEO Mark Zuckerberg posted a statement to Facebook: "Trump says Facebook is against him. Liberals say we helped Trump. Both sides are upset about ideas and content they don't like. That's what running a platform for all ideas looks like."

A large Facebook group called "Stop the Steal" was dedicated to the idea that the November 2020 election was "stolen" from Trump by some type of fraud. Two days after the election, Facebook banned the group and its hashtags.

Instagram
Trump initially used his personal account on Instagram (@realDonaldTrump) primarily to share personal pictures, including images of himself with his grandchildren. In September 2015 – then with approximately 377thousand followers – he used the platform to release a political advertisement. This ad, "Act of Love", attacked primary opponent Jeb Bush on the topic of immigration. Along with Bush's responses, it demonstrated that Instagram could be a political tool rather than merely a personal photo-sharing application. Trump also used the platform to contribute to the controversy regarding the 2016 film Ghostbusters by posting a video criticizing the all-female cast. In response, director Paul Feig claimed that "Trump supporters" were responsible for some of the "internet hate" directed at the film.

When Trump became president, his personal account had grown to over 5million followers. He also assumed control of an official account (@whitehouse), where he posted pictures from his inauguration. At that time, it was expected that the official account would primarily feature the work of the Chief Official White House Photographer once one was selected; however, Shealah Craighead has contributed relatively little, especially in comparison to Pete Souza's work during the Obama administration.

Reddit
On July 27, 2016, Trump took part in an Ask Me Anything (AMA), where he responded to user-submitted questions from Reddit's r/The Donald community. He offered replies on topics that varied from media bias and voter fraud to NASA, including a question about H-1B visas posed by far-right media personality Milo Yiannopoulos. Trump also posted several pre-debate messages on the subreddit.

YouTube
From 2011 until 2013 or 2014, Trump created over 80 installments of a vlog on YouTube called "From the Desk of Donald Trump". In it, he discussed a variety of topics, ranging from serious issues such as the Libyan Civil War, Obamacare, and the American job market to less weighty matters, including the Vanity Fair Oscar party and his dislike of Mike McGlone's Rhetorical Questions advertisements for GEICO. In several installments, he speculated on a possible presidential candidacy in 2012 that never came to pass, but many of the themes featured in the vlog were part of his successful campaign in 2016. By June 2017, most of these videos were no longer available on YouTube under Trump's account.

Trump's YouTube account was suspended for policy violations for at least seven days on January 13, 2021, following the attack at the United States Capitol; for this period it was no longer possible for new videos to be uploaded to the site. On January 26, 2021, YouTube extended the ban stating, "In light of concerns about the ongoing potential for violence, the Donald J. Trump channel will remain suspended. Our teams are staying vigilant and closely monitoring for any new developments." On March 4, 2021, YouTube CEO Susan Wojcicki stated that YouTube will lift the suspension on Donald Trump's channel when "the risk of violence has decreased." On July 7, 2021, Trump filed a class action lawsuit against YouTube and its CEO. On March 17, 2023, YouTube reinstated Trump's YouTube account.

Snapchat 
On June 3, 2020, Snapchat announced that it would no longer promote Trump's account on its "Discover" page, which curates stories from celebrities and politicians. This followed the President's sharing of his controversial June 1 photo outside St. John's Church, which had been taken after dispersing protestors from the area using tear gas. He had also shared screenshots of several tweets. Three days earlier, co-founder and CEO Evan Spiegel had sent a company memo stating that "we simply cannot promote accounts in America that are linked to people who incite racial violence, whether they do so on or off our platform."

On January 6, 2021, following the attack at the United States Capitol, Snapchat locked Trump's account. The company announced on January 13, 2021, that it would keep his account blocked permanently.

Twitch 
Trump has a Twitch account used primarily to broadcast his rallies. On June 29, 2020, his account was temporarily banned. Twitch stated the ban was made because of violations in their rules against hate speech. They pointed out an incident in 2016 where Trump made comments about rapists, drug dealers, and criminals coming to America from Mexico and an incident in his rally in Tulsa, Oklahoma, in 2020 where he told a fictional story of a "tough hombre" breaking into someone's home as proof of these violations. This ban was lifted 2 weeks later.

On January 7, 2021, Trump's Twitch account was disabled indefinitely. This was done in response to Trump's alleged incitement of the Capitol attack. While his profile and archived videos are still viewable, he will not be able to stream as long as his account is disabled.

Triller 
In August 2020, Trump joined Triller and was immediately verified and promoted on the app. His action was interpreted by many as a move against TikTok, a Chinese competitor of Triller's. Trump had previously threatened to ban TikTok.

Parler 
Parler, a social media platform that launched in 2018, attracted supporters of Donald Trump from its beginning. The Trump campaign has a Parler account, although Trump himself does not have a personal account as of early January 2021. Other Parler users include Trump's former campaign director Brad Parscale; Trump's son, Eric Trump; Senator Ted Cruz; and White House press secretary Kayleigh McEnany. After Facebook banned the "Stop the Steal" group several days after the November 2020 election, many of those people moved to Parler. There had been speculation that Donald Trump might move to Parler, although the platform remained relatively small compared to the Twitter platform he was accustomed to. After Trump was banned from Twitter and other platforms, his son-in-law Jared Kushner reportedly obstructed him from moving to Parler and Gab.

Gab 
In early February 2021, multiple media outlets falsely reported that former-President Trump had joined Gab under the handle @realdonaldtrump. The Independent speculated "that confusion arose from the presence of a blue check mark indicating the account was verified" and Vice News speculated that the bio of the account, which read "45th President of the United States of America. Uncensored posts from the @realDonaldTrump Feed." had also caused confusion. The Gab post that was mistaken to be from Trump was actually from Gab CEO Andrew Torba and featured a copy of a genuine letter sent by Trump's lawyers to Democratic Representative Jamie Raskin, who had called on Trump to testify at his second impeachment hearing. Thousands of users on Gab, including QAnon influencers, were also led to believe after the post was made that Trump had joined the platform under the handle. Torba responded to the false reports in a post on Gab, saying that "@realdonaldtrump is and always has been a mirror archive of POTUS' tweets and statements that we've run for years. We've always been transparent about this and would obviously let people know if the President starts using it." He also criticized the media outlets that falsely reported that Trump had joined the platform. Also in response to the false reports, the @realdonaldtrump Gab account made a post that was pinned saying that the account is reserved for Trump and urged users of Gab to send messages to Trump asking him to join the platform.

Rumble 
On June 26, 2021, Trump joined video hosting platform Rumble in preparation of recording his Ohio rally. On December 14, 2021, it was announced that Rumble was already providing cloud services to the Truth Social beta website.

Gettr 
A new platform called Gettr was launched on July 4, 2021, with Jason Miller- an advisor to Trump's 2016 and 2020 campaigns- as CEO. Trump was reportedly not involved in Gettr, though Miller hoped he would join the platform.

Trump's own social media networks 
Shortly after Trump left office, he quietly incorporated Trump Media and Technology Group in February 2021, a company that had no significant funding. On March 21, Trump posted a statement on his new website, 45office.com, which was "liked and shared" hundreds of thousands of times on Facebook and Twitter. That same day, Trump advisor Jason Miller claimed on Fox News that Trump would be "returning to social media in probably about two or three months" by founding a new network that would "completely redefine the game." He said he expected "tens of millions" of users. On October 20, 2021, Trump Media and Technology Group obtained hundreds of millions of dollars in funding by agreeing to merge with Digital World Acquisition, and the anticipated creation of a social media app called "Truth Social" was announced that same day.

45office.com 
On March 21, 2021, Trump posted a statement about the US–Mexico border to his website 45office.com that was "liked and shared more than 661,000 times" on Facebook and Twitter, although he himself was already banned from those platforms. The existence of the website 45office.com was formally announced a week later on March 29. It included a biography and photos of Trump and his wife. Visitors could make requests for personalized greetings or attendance at an event. The site centered around a history of Donald Trump's presidency that did not make mention of two impeachments, of any COVID-19 death toll, of the economic crash that followed the pandemic, or of the Capitol attack that marked the end of his term.

From the Desk of Donald J. Trump 
On May 4, 2021, Trump launched a new web page, "From the Desk of Donald J. Trump," on the site of his Save America political action committee DonaldJTrump.com, where he was posting messages under 280 characters that visitors could share to Facebook or Twitter (platforms that had banned Trump from having his own accounts there). Although the site claimed to be a "communications platform" where his supporters could "freely and safely" speak, there was no way for users to post any content of their own nor to reply to Trump's posts. The day the blog launched, it had 159,000 social media interactions; on the second day, less than one-fifth that amount; and on subsequent days, at least for the next two weeks, it never reached 10 percent of the interaction of its first day. According to an estimate by The Washington Post, in mid-May, "Trump's website – including his new blog, fundraising page and online storefront – attracted fewer estimated visitors than the pet-adoption service Petfinder and the recipe site Delish." The site was permanently closed less than a month after its launch.

Truth Social 

On October 20, 2021, it was announced that Trump would be launching a new social media website called Truth Social. It is to be run by Trump Media & Technology Group, a company incorporated in February 2021 and which on October 20, 2021, made a deal to merge with a special purpose acquisition company, Digital World Acquisition, that will fund it. The Republican National Committee sent an email the next day asking supporters to join Truth Social. Truth Social debuted in Apple's App Store on February 21, 2022. The app has drawn "1.2 million installations, according to Sensor Tower" as of March 29, 2022.

According to reports, Trump has a licensing agreement with TMTG requiring him to use Truth Social as his primary social media platform, and to wait at least six hours before reposting material to any other social media platform, with some exceptions for political activities.

On the Chinese internet
In Chinese publications Trump is variously known as Chuānpǔ and Tèlǎngpǔ, both based on the pronunciation of his surname. Users on the Chinese internet refer to Trump as Chuānpǔ, instead of Tèlǎngpǔ, and/or various parody nicknames. Ji Siqi of the South China Morning Post wrote that the informal use is because Chuānpǔ "just has two characters so it's easier to say or type."

There are two spellings of Donald Trump's surname in Chinese, both introduced before his entering the political stage. 
The spelling 特朗普 (pinyin Tèlǎngpǔ) was introduced for the Chinese translation of his The Art of the Deal (1987, trans. 1989) and  川普 (pinyin Chuānpǔ) for the Chinese translation of Trump-Style Negotiations by George H. Ross (2008). Both versions are attempts to approximate the English pronunciation of the name to Chinese phonology, the former being more closely associated with British English and the latter with American English.
With the election of Donald Trump as US president, there has been some debate in Chinese media as to which spelling to use, because it seemed impractical to keep using two variants.  But there now seems to be a division between Mainland Chinese sources, PRC state media, the Chinese-language BBC and Hong Kong media using 特朗普 on one hand vs. sources in Taiwan and most overseas Chinese using 川普 on the other. Apart from these two spellings used in mainstream media, there are deliberately disparaging spellings used in Chinese social media, such as 闯破 or 床破 (pinyin Chuángpò, including the pejorative 破 "low-quality; poor; lousy").

Trump's assertion of his understanding of COVID-19 resulted in the nickname Dǒng Wáng. A perception that Trump is harming the United States to the benefit of China gave him the nickname Chuān Jiànguó meaning "Trump Building Country" with the country being China. Additionally he is known as Chuān Bǎo, which Ji Siqi compared to the insult "Orange Baby". Another nickname referring to the Chinese perception of Trump being an authoritarian, which Ji Siqi states "contradicts American democracy as perceived by Chinese people", is Chuān Huáng, and Dà Tǒnglǐng. The perception of Trump being, in Ji Siqi's words, "an avaricious businessman running [the United States as] a company" resulted in the name Chuān Zǒng. The, in Ji Siqi's words, "very frequent flip-flops", resulted in Tè Méipǔ with "mei" being "no"; therefore the literal meaning of "Te Meipu" is "very capricious".

According to the South China Morning Post, reactions on the Chinese internet to Trump's permanent Twitter suspension  were mixed. Many were shocked that US social media platforms "had the audacity to silence the country's president." Some supported Trump's suspension, while others were sympathetic towards Trump due to also being banned off of social media platforms.

See also

 1600 Daily
 Barack Obama on social media
 Fake news
 History of communication by presidents of the United States
 List of Internet phenomena
 List of most-followed Twitter accounts
 Microtargeting
 Social media use in politics
 Trump administration communication during the COVID-19 pandemic
 Trump derangement syndrome
 Twitter diplomacy
 Use of Twitter by public figures
 Veracity of statements by Donald Trump
 Volfefe index

Notes

References

Further reading

External links

 Trump Tweets at CNN
 List of Donald Trump deleted tweets on Factbase
 Trump Twitter archive
 

 
2009 beginnings
2000s in mass media
2010s in mass media
Computer-related introductions in 2015
E-government in the United States
Mass media-related controversies in the United States
Social media
Trumpism
Twitter accounts
2010s in Internet culture
Social media
Censorship in the United States
Political communication
Twitter controversies